West brewery is an alcoholic beverage restaurant located in the Templeton Building on Glasgow Green, Scotland. West produce German Style lagers and wheat beers, both in kegs and bottles, which are sold primarily to the UK market. All West lagers and wheat beers are brewed in strict accordance with the 1516 Reinheitsgebot, the ancient German Purity Law.

History

West Brewery opened in March 2006, serving beer made in its Glasgow Green microbrewery to customers in the adjoining beer hall, West on the Green. The company West Brewing Company went into administration but was bought back by Wetzel in 2008.

Since its original conception as a German-style brewpub, West distributes its draught and bottled beers widely throughout the UK. West is now available in more than 3,000 outlets in the UK, as well as in packaged format at several major supermarkets.

In 2016, following a decade in business, West opened a new £5 million brewery, housed in the same premises within the iconic Templeton Building on Glasgow Green. The new brewery brought with it a ten-fold increase in capacity to 25,000 hectolitres a year. 

In the same year, West on the Green also expanded with the opening of an adjacent 250-capacity Wedding and Events space.

Products
All West beers are brewed in strict accordance with the 1516 Reinheitsgebot, the ancient German Purity Law which allows only malted barley, hops, yeast and water to be used in the brewing process. This means that all West products are free from chemicals, preservatives, and any other additives, and are all suitable for vegans.

Awards
West has won many awards for its lagers and wheat beer, as well as for the restaurant on Glasgow Green. Awards include:

 SIBA Supreme Champion Craft Beer in Keg 2011 (Gold) for Hefeweizen
 SIBA Champion Speciality Beer 2011 (Gold) for Hefeweizen
 SIBA Champion Coloured and Dark Lager 2011 (Silver) for Munich Red
 SIBA Champion Coloured and Dark Lager 2011 (Bronze) for Dunkel
 AA Pub of the Year Scotland 2012-2013
 SLTN Family Outlet of the Year 2012
 Scottish Restaurant Awards – Best Family Friendly Restaurant 2011

References

External links
West Home page

Breweries in Scotland
Buildings and structures in Glasgow
Manufacturing companies based in Glasgow
Food and drink companies based in Glasgow
Glasgow Green
Tourist attractions in Glasgow
2006 establishments in Scotland
British companies established in 2006